The 2020–21 UConn Huskies men's basketball team represented the University of Connecticut in the 2020–21 NCAA Division I men's basketball season. The Huskies are led by third-year head coach Dan Hurley in their first season of the Big East Conference. Due to the COVID-19 pandemic, the Huskies played all of their home games this year at Harry A. Gampel Pavilion on the UConn campus in Storrs, Connecticut.

The Huskies returned to the new Big East for the 2020–21 season following seven years in the American Athletic Conference.

They finished the season 15-8, 11-6, in Big East Play to finish in 3rd place. They defeated DePaul in the quarterfinals of the Big East tournament before losing in the semifinals to Creighton. They received an at-large bid to the NCAA tournament where they lost in the First Round to Maryland.

Previous season
They finished the season 19–12, 10–8 in AAC play to finish in a tie for fifth place. Their season ended when the AAC Tournament and all other postseason tournaments were canceled due to the COVID-19 pandemic.

Offseason

Departures

Incoming transfers

2020 recruiting class

Roster

Javonte Brown was only on the roster for the fall semester and announced plans to transfer on January 8, 2021.

Schedule and results

|-
!colspan=12 style=|Non-conference regular season

|-
!colspan=12 style=|Big East Conference regular season

|-
!colspan=9 style="|Big East tournament

|-
!colspan=9 style="|NCAA tournament

Rankings

Awards and honors

References

UConn Huskies men's basketball seasons
Connecticut
Connecticut Huskies men's basketball
Connecticut Huskies men's basketball
UConn